John Wilke (December 12, 1954 – May 1, 2009) was an American investigative reporter and news editor in the Washington bureau of The Wall Street Journal for two decades, beginning in 1989 and lasting until his death in 2009.

Wilke was born in White Plains, New York. He earned his bachelor's degree with a double major in psychology and biology from New College in Sarasota, Florida. He earned his M.A. from the Columbia University Graduate School of Journalism.

He began his career in 1983 as an intern at The Washington Post. He joined BusinessWeek as a Washington correspondent in 1984 and became a staff writer for The Boston Globe in 1986.

In July 1989, Wilke joined the Wall Street Journals Boston bureau, covering technology. He moved to the Washington bureau in May 1995, covering economics and the Federal Reserve Bank until December 1996, when he began covering government technology policy, the Federal Trade Commission and the United States Department of Justice.

In 2006, private fraud investigator Harry Markopolos gave extensive details about the Bernard Madoff Ponzi scheme to Wilke, who showed interest in the story. According to Markopolos, Wilke's editors did not allow him to pursue the story.

He died in 2009 in Bethesda, Maryland.

From his obituary in the Journal: "In recent years, [Wilke] specialized in articles about deals cut by members of Congress to win special appropriations, known as earmarks, for friends, supporters and business associates back home. One of his investigations helped lead to last year's indictment of then-Rep. Rick Renzi (R., Ariz.), who is accused of receiving favors from developers and copper-mining executives in return for congressional help. Another revealed the broad range of earmarks a powerful Democrat, Rep. John Murtha, used to bring federal contracts to his Pennsylvania district."

Awards
 He won a Computer Press Association award with David Bank for his coverage of Microsoft.
 He won the Everett McKinley Dirksen (2007) prize for "distinguished coverage of Congress" for his reporting on congressional earmarks.

Death
Wilke died, aged 54, on May 1, 2009, from pancreatic cancer in Bethesda, Maryland.

References

External links
 Washington Post report of Wilke's death
  Wall Street Journal online
 UCLA site
 CJR report of Wilke's death
 JRW site, with reminiscences
 Nocera, Joe, reminiscence "In Praise of John Wilke" Executive Suite blog, The New York Times, 5/5/09. Retrieved 5/5/09.

1954 births
2009 deaths
American male journalists
20th-century American journalists
Deaths from cancer in Maryland
Columbia University Graduate School of Journalism alumni
Deaths from pancreatic cancer
New College of Florida alumni
People from Bethesda, Maryland